The 1992 Dartmouth Big Green football team represented Dartmouth College in the 1992 NCAA Division I-AA football season.

Schedule

References

Dartmouth
Dartmouth Big Green football seasons
Ivy League football champion seasons
Dartmouth Big Green football